William Henry Gledhill (May 9, 1858 – January 7, 1920) was an American politician from New York.

Life 
Gledhill was born on May 9, 1858, in New York City, New York.

After he finished school at 14, he began working with his father as a member of the wallpaper manufacturing firm Henry Gledhill & Co.

In 1895, Gledhill was elected to the New York State Assembly as a Democrat, representing the New York County 11th District. He served in the Assembly in 1896 and 1897. In 1897, he was elected to the Board of Alderman and then became vice-president of the Board. In 1905, he became clerk of Part VI, Special Term, the New York Supreme Court in New York County.

Gledhill had a wife, son, and daughter. He was a member of the Ancient Order of United Workmen.

Gledhill died at his home in Flushing of pneumonia on January 7, 1920. He was buried in Calvary Cemetery.

References

External links 

 The Political Graveyard
 William H. Gledhill at Find a Grave

1858 births
1920 deaths
Politicians from Manhattan
New York City Council members
19th-century American politicians
Democratic Party members of the New York State Assembly
People from Flushing, Queens
Deaths from pneumonia in New York City
Burials at Calvary Cemetery (Queens)